Earlie Bee Thomas (December 11, 1945 – July 3, 2022) was an American football cornerback in the National Football League. He was drafted by the New York Jets in the 11th round of the 1970 NFL Draft. He played college football at Colorado State.

Born in Denton, Texas, Thomas also played for the Denver Broncos.

References

External links
New York Jets bio

1945 births
2022 deaths
Sportspeople from Denton, Texas
Players of American football from Texas
American football cornerbacks
Colorado State Rams football players
New York Jets players
Denver Broncos players
Sportspeople from the Dallas–Fort Worth metroplex